Uma2rman (previously Umaturman, Uma2rmaH) is a Russian pop rock band made up of two brothers, Sergei and Vladimir Kristovsky. They have been active since 2003, releasing their first album "V Gorode N" in 2004. Additional musicians have been hired for concerts such as Alexei Ernst - keyboard, Sergey Solodkin - drums, Alexei Kozhakov and Yuri Terletsky (current) - solo guitar. They were nominated in the 2004 Europe MTV Music Awards for Best Russian Group, along with t.A.T.u. and Gorod 312 but lost to Dima Bilan.

The group has also contributed to the Romance soundtrack of the 2009 film Female Passenger (Passazhirka). A Russian clipper Dauntless is sailing from San Francisco to Hong Kong. The Russian consul asks the capitan to take a woman passenger on board. A woman on board is a well known sailor curse. This warning is ignored by the main movie characters who welcome the woman. The captain even offers her his own quarters as accommodation during the voyage. They find that they are rather unprepared for what follows.

On the album V gorode N, the track "Nochnoi Dozor" featured as the theme tune to the original Russian cut of the film Night Watch. In addition the track "Uma Thurman" is a song about how Vladimir has fallen in love with the real Uma Thurman. In the song Uma complains about how Quentin Tarantino was drunk and that she had to reprimand him for his behaviour. Then she tells Vladimir how glad she is that he came. The two never met in real life, before the Kill Bill: Volume 2 premiere in Moscow.

The group consists of Dmitry Kozlov, Ruslan Semenov, Yuriy Terletskyy, Vladislav Cherednichenko, Alexey Kaplun, Sergey Solodkin, and Stanislav Veretenov.

In May 2022, Uma2rman participated in a concert organized in order to support the 2022 Russian invasion of Ukraine.

Discography

Studio albums 
 2004 — "V Gorode N" (В Городе N; In Unknown City)
 2005 — "A Mozhet, Eto Son?" (А Может Это Сон?; Maybe It's A Dream?)
 2008 — "Kuda Privodyat Mechty" (Куда Приводят Мечты?; Where To Do Dreams Lead?)
 2009 — "1825"
 2011 — "V etom gorode vse sumasshedshiye" (В этом городе все сумасшедшие; Everyone Is Mad In This City)
 2016 — "Poy, vesna!" (Пой, весна!; Sing, Spring!)

Singles

References

External links 
  
 Uma Turman Unofficial Site
 MSNBC: Russian rockers desperately seeking Thurman
 Uma2rman at the Forbes

Musical groups established in 2003
Russian pop music groups